N,N′-Dimethylpropyleneurea (DMPU) is a cyclic urea sometimes used as a polar, aprotic organic solvent. In 1985, Dieter Seebach showed that it is possible to replace the suspected carcinogen hexamethylphosphoramide (HMPA) with DMPU.

References

Further reading

Solvents
Green chemistry

Amide solvents
Amides
Ureas
Nitrogen heterocycles
Heterocyclic compounds with 1 ring